Lake Jennings is a water supply reservoir in San Diego County, California.  It is located in Lakeside, Ca.

Recreation 
People can have picnics at Lake Jennings.

The campground at Lake Jennings Park has a variety of campsites available, including hookups and primitive tent sites.

Fishing 
Licensed people can fish at Lake Jennings on Fridays, Saturdays and Sundays.

See also
 List of reservoirs and dams in California
 List of lakes in California

References

Further reading
 
 

Jennings, Lake
Cuyamaca Mountains
Jennings
Jennings